It's the Rage is a 1999 film version of Keith Reddin's play "All The Rage" about three interconnected stories and how handguns affect each of the nine people involved. The film is the directorial debut of producer James D. Stern.

Plot
Handguns figure in the intertwining lives of nine people. Warren (Jeff Daniels) shoots his wife Helen's (Joan Allen) lover and his defense is that he thought he was shooting an intruder. She leaves him; and her lawyer (Andre Braugher) helps her get a job with a nutty, reclusive computer wizard (Gary Sinise) who waves a pistol about, sometimes at Helen. Tennel (Josh Brolin), the computer geek's ex-assistant, lands a video-store job and is smitten by Annabel Lee (Anna Paquin), an aggressive street kid who likes complaining about men to her pistol-packing psychotic brother (Giovanni Ribisi) to set him off. In secret, Annabel starts an affair with the lawyer, but things are complicated when the lawyer's gay lover (David Schwimmer) finds out. Meanwhile, a cop (Robert Forster) stays on Warren's tail.

Cast
 Joan Allen as Helen
Andre Braugher as Tim
Josh Brolin as Tennel
Jeff Daniels as Warren Harding
Robert Forster as Tyler
January Jones as Janice Taylor
Anna Paquin as Annabel Lee
Giovanni Ribisi as Sidney
David Schwimmer as Chris
Gary Sinise as Morgan
Muse Watson as Cleaner
Bokeem Woodbine as Agee

Production
Filming took place in Los Angeles, California.

The film was first aired on cable television as All the Rage. It never entered wide release in American theaters (showing only at a few select film festivals), although the DVD release has had some mild success. It also showed at the Milan International Film Festival, winning awards for Best Acting (Gary Sinise), Best Director, Best Editing, Best Film, Best Music, Best Screenwriting as well as the Audience Award.

Reception
Rotten Tomatoes gives the film a critic rating of 27%.

References

External links
 
 
 

1999 films
1999 drama films
American films based on plays
American independent films
Films scored by Mark Mothersbaugh
American drama films
1990s English-language films
Films directed by James D. Stern
1990s American films